Environmental philosophy is a branch of philosophy that is concerned with the natural environment and humans' place within it. It asks crucial questions about human environmental relations such as "What do we mean when we talk about nature?" "What is the value of the natural, that is non-human environment to us, or in itself?" "How should we respond to environmental challenges such as environmental degradation, pollution and climate change?" "How can we best understand the relationship between the natural world and human technology and development?" and "What is our place in the natural world?" Environmental philosophy includes environmental ethics, environmental aesthetics, ecofeminism, environmental hermeneutics, and environmental theology. Some of the main areas of interest for environmental philosophers are:

 Defining environment and nature
 How to value the environment
 Moral status of animals and plants
 Endangered species
 Environmentalism and deep ecology
 Aesthetic value of nature
 Intrinsic value
 Wilderness
 Restoration of nature
 Consideration of future generations
 Ecophenomenology

Contemporary issues
Modern issues within environmental philosophy include but are not restricted to the concerns of environmental activism, questions raised by science and technology, environmental justice, and climate change. These include issues related to the depletion of finite resources and other harmful and permanent effects brought on to the environment by humans, as well as the ethical and practical problems raised by philosophies and practices of environmental conservation, restoration, and policy in general. Another question that has settled on the minds of modern environmental philosophers is "Do rivers have rights?" At the same time environmental philosophy deals with the value human beings attach to different kinds of environmental experience, particularly how experiences in or close to non-human environments contrast with urban or industrialized experiences, and how this varies across cultures with close attention paid to indigenous people.

Modern history
Environmental philosophy emerged as a branch of philosophy in 1970s. Early environmental philosophers include Seyyed Hossein Nasr, Richard Routley, Arne Næss, and J. Baird Callicott. The movement was an attempt to connect with humanity's sense of alienation from nature in a continuing fashion throughout history. This was very closely related to the development at the same time of ecofeminism, an intersecting discipline. Since then its areas of concern have expanded significantly.

The field is today characterized by a notable diversity of stylistic, philosophical and cultural approaches to human environmental relationships, from personal and poetic reflections on environmental experience and arguments for panpsychism to Malthusian applications of game theory or the question of how to put an economic value on nature's services. A major debate arose in the 1970s and 80s was that of whether nature has intrinsic value in itself independent of human values or whether its value is merely instrumental, with ecocentric or deep ecology approaches emerging on the one hand versus consequentialist or pragmatist anthropocentric approaches on the other.

Another debate that arose at this time was the debate over whether there really is such a thing as wilderness or not, or whether it is merely a cultural construct with colonialist implications as suggested by William Cronon. Since then, readings of environmental history and discourse have become more critical and refined. In this ongoing debate, a diversity of dissenting voices have emerged from different cultures around the world questioning the dominance of Western assumptions, helping to transform the field into a global area of thought.

In recent decades, there has been a significant challenge to deep ecology and the concepts of nature that underlie it, some arguing that there is not really such a thing as nature at all beyond some self-contradictory and even politically dubious constructions of an ideal other that ignore the real human-environmental interactions that shape our world and lives. This has been alternately dubbed the postmodern, constructivist, and most recently post-naturalistic turn in environmental philosophy. Environmental aesthetics, design and restoration have emerged as important intersecting disciplines that keep shifting the boundaries of environmental thought, as have the science of climate change and biodiversity and the ethical, political and epistemological questions they raise.

Social ecology movement

In 1982, Murray Bookchin described his philosophy of Social Ecology  which provides a framework for understanding nature, our relationship with nature, and our relationships to each other.
According to this philosophy, defining nature as "unspoiled wilderness" denies that humans are biological creatures created by natural evolution. It also takes issue with the attitude that "everything that exists is natural", as this provides us with no framework for judging a landfill as less natural than a forest. Instead, social ecology defines nature as a tendency in healthy ecosystems toward greater levels of diversity, complementarity, and freedom. Practices that are congruent with these principles are more natural than those that are not.

Building from this foundation, Bookchin argues that "The ecological crisis is a social crisis":
 Practices which simplify biodiversity and dominate nature (monocropping, overfishing, clearcutting, etc) are linked to societal tendencies to simplify and dominate humanity.
 Such societies create cultural institutions like poverty, racism, patriarchy, homophobia, and genocide from this same desire to simplify and dominate.
 In turn, Social Ecology suggests addressing the root causes of environmental degradation requires creating a society that promotes decentralization, interdependence, and direct democracy rather than profit extraction.

Deep ecology movement

In 1984, George Sessions and Arne Næss articulated the principles of the new Deep Ecology Movement.
These basic principles are:

 The well-being and flourishing of human and non-human life have value.
 Richness and diversity of life forms contribute to the realization of these values and are also values in themselves.
 Humans have no right to reduce this richness and diversity except to satisfy vital needs.
 The flourishing of human life and cultures is compatible with a substantial decrease in the human population.
 Present human interference with the nonhuman world is excessive, and the situation is rapidly worsening.
 Policies must therefore be changed. These policies affect basic economic, technological, and ideological structures. The resulting state of affairs will be deeply different from the present.
 The ideological change is mainly that of appreciating life quality (dwelling in situations of inherent value), rather than adhering to an increasingly higher standard of living. There will be a profound awareness of the difference between big and great.
 Those who subscribe to the foregoing points have an obligation directly or indirectly to try to implement the necessary changes.

Resacralization of nature

See also 

 Environmental Philosophy (journal)
 Environmental Values
 Environmental Ethics (journal)
 List of environmental philosophers
 Environmental hermeneutics

References

Notes

Further reading 
 Armstrong, Susan, Richard Botzler. Environmental Ethics: Divergence and Convergence, McGraw-Hill, Inc., New York, New York. .
 Auer, Matthew, 2019. Environmental Aesthetics in the Age of Climate Change, Sustainability, 11 (18), 5001.
 Benson, John, 2000. Environmental Ethics: An Introduction with Readings, Psychology Press.
 Callicott, J. Baird, and Michael Nelson, 1998. The Great New Wilderness Debate, University of Georgia Press.
 Conesa-Sevilla, J., 2006. The Intrinsic Value of the Whole: Cognitive and Utilitarian Evaluative Processes as they Pertain to  Ecocentric, Deep Ecological, and Ecopsychological "Valuing.", The Trumpeter, 22 (2), 26-42.
 Derr, Patrick, G, Edward McNamara, 2003.  Case Studies in Environmental Ethics, Bowman & Littlefield Publishers.  
 DesJardins, Joseph R., Environmental Ethics  Wadsworth Publishing Company, ITP, An International Thomson Publishing Company, Belmont, California.  A Division of Wadsworth, Inc.
 Devall, W. and G. Sessions. 1985. Deep Ecology: Living As if Nature Mattered, Salt Lake City: Gibbs M. Smith, Inc.
 Drengson, Inoue, 1995. "The Deep Ecology Movement," North Atlantic Books, Berkeley, California.
 Foltz, Bruce V., Robert Frodeman. 2004. Rethinking Nature, Indiana University Press, 601 North Morton Street, Bloomington, IN 47404-3797  
 Keulartz, Jozef, 1999. The Struggle for Nature: A Critique of Environmental Philosophy, Routledge.
 LaFreniere, Gilbert F, 2007. The Decline of Nature: Environmental History and the Western Worldview, Academica Press, Bethesda, MD 
 Light, Andrew, and Eric Katz,1996. Environmental Pragmatism, Psychology Press. 
 Mannison, D., M. McRobbie, and R. Routley (ed), 1980.  Environmental Philosophy, Australian National University
 Matthews, Steve, 2002. [https://core.ac.uk/download/pdf/48856927.pdf A Hybrid Theory of Environmentalism, Essays in Philosophy, 3.
 Næss, A. 1989. Ecology, Community and Lifestyle: Outline of an Ecosophy, Translated by D. Rothenberg. Cambridge: Cambridge University Press.
 Oelschlaeger, Max, 1993. The Idea of Wilderness: From Prehistory to the Age of Ecology, New Haven: Yale University Press,  
 Pojman, Louis P., Paul Pojman. Environmental Ethics, Thomson-Wadsworth, United States
 Sarvis, Will. Embracing Philanthropic Environmentalism: The Grand Responsibility of Stewardship, (McFarland, 2019).
 Sherer, D., ed, Thomas Attig.  1983.  Ethics and the Environment, Prentice-Hall, Inc., Englewood Cliffs, New Jersey 07632. 
 VanDeVeer, Donald, Christine Pierce. The Environmental Ethics and Policy Book, Wadsworth Publishing Company.  An International Thomson Publishing Company
 Vogel, Steven, 1999. Environmental Philosophy After the End of Nature, Environmental Ethics 24 (1):23-39
 Weston, 1999. An Invitation to Environmental Philosophy, Oxford University Press, New York, New York.
 Zimmerman, Michael E., J. Baird Callicott, George Sessions, Karen J. Warren, John Clark. 1993.Environmental Philosophy: From Animal Rights to Radical Ecology, Prentice-Hall, Inc., Englewood Cliffs, New Jersey 07632

External links
 

 
Spinoza studies